The 2022 Rose Bowl was a college football bowl game played on January 1, 2022, with kickoff at 5:13 p.m. EST (2:13 p.m. local PST) and televised on ESPN. It was the 108th edition of the Rose Bowl Game, and was one of the 2021–22 bowl games concluding the 2021 FBS football season. Sponsored by Capital One Venture X, the game was officially known as the Rose Bowl Game presented by Capital One Venture X.

The game was organized by the Pasadena Tournament of Roses Association and was preceded by the Rose Parade in the morning. Actor LeVar Burton served as Grand Marshal of the Rose Parade. The theme was "Dream. Believe. Achieve." The winner of the game was awarded with the Leishman Trophy.

Teams
Consistent with conference tie-ins, the game was played between Big Ten Conference representative Ohio State and Pac-12 Conference champion Utah. The teams were officially welcomed to Southern California at Disneyland on December 27.

This marked the second meeting between the teams; they first met on September 27, 1986, at Ohio Stadium where Ohio State defeated Utah, 64–6.

Ohio State Buckeyes

The Buckeyes, the co-champions of the Big Ten Conference East Division, made their 16th trip to Pasadena to compete in a Rose Bowl Game. Ohio State finished their regular season with an overall 10–2 record, 8–1 in Big Ten games. Their losses came to Oregon in the second week of the season, and to Michigan at the end of the season. The loss to Michigan dropped the Buckeyes out of a spot in the College Football Playoff. Ohio State defeated three ranked teams during the regular season: Penn State, Purdue, and Michigan State. Quarterback C.J. Stroud placed fourth in the annual Heisman Trophy race.

Utah Utes

Winners of the Pac-12 championship, this was the first Rose Bowl Game for the Utes. Utah finished their regular season with a 9–3 overall record, 8–1 in Pac-12 play. Their losses came to BYU, San Diego State, and Oregon State. The Utes then faced Oregon in the Pac-12 Championship Game, a rematch between the teams. Utah had defeated Oregon on November 20 by a 38–7 score, and defeated them again for the Pac-12 title, 38–10. The Utes entered the Rose Bowl with an overall 10–3 record.

Game summary

Statistics

Game highlights
The game featured the biggest plays (i.e., plays over 30 yards) in a Rose Bowl. Wide receiver Jaxon Smith-Njigba set school, all-Bowls, and FBS receiving records with 347 yards on 15 receptions (23.13 yards per catch average). Quarterback C.J. Stroud set a new school and Rose Bowl record with 573 passing yards (no sacks), and a Rose Bowl record six passing touchdowns. The Buckeyes' 683 total yards were a new school record as well as a record for the program in any bowl. Both teams scored 56 points combined by halftime, tying a Rose Bowl record.

Marvin Harrison, Jr. made his first collegiate career start, catching three touchdowns.

Broadcasting
The game was nationally telecasted by ESPN. Chris Fowler Handled Play-by-play duties while Kirk Herbstreit provided color analysis. Holly Rowe and Tiffany Blackmon served as sideline reporters. On National Radio Tom Hart called the game with Jordan Rodgers as his color analyst and Cole Cubelic as their sideline reporter for ESPN Radio. Locally, WBNS broadcast the game in Ohio with Paul Keels and Jim Lachey on the call. In Utah, KALL put on the broadcast, called by Bill Riley, Scott Mitchell, and Stevenson Sylvester. Internationally, the game was made available by ESPN Brasil, with Matheus Suman and Antony Curti on the call

Hall of Fame
The Rose Bowl Hall of Fame induction ceremony was held on December 30, 2021, in front of the Rose Bowl stadium. The 2021 class consisted of Anthony Davis (USC), Jim Delany (Big Ten Conference), and Ron Simpkins (Michigan).

References

External links
 Game statistics at statbroadcast.com

Rose Bowl
Rose Bowl Game
Ohio State Buckeyes football bowl games
Utah Utes football bowl games
Rose Bowl
21st century in Pasadena, California
Rose Bowl